"Whiskey Does" is a song co-written and recorded by Canadian country rock artist Tim Hicks. He wrote the song with Deric Ruttan and Monty Criswell, while Ruttan produced it. It was the lead single off Hicks' fifth studio album Talk to Time.

Background
Hicks and his co-writers wrote "Whiskey Does" in 2021, and he stated it was based on the idea that "everyone's been in a relationship at some point in their life that's maybe not the best relationship for you, but there's something there that keeps you going back to the well to 'try again,'" with the singer in the song deciding to "choose the whiskey over the toxic relationship".

Critical reception
Nanci Dagg of Canadian Beats Media stated that the track "showcases Hicks’s versatility," calling it a "a heartbreaking story with an inebriating effect" that is "grounded by his unmistakable voice". Top Country named the song their "Pick of the Week" for March 4, 2022, describing it as "an amazing radio-friendly song," noting Hicks' "crisp vocals".

Accolades

Music video
The official music video for "Whiskey Does" was directed by Adam Rothlein and premiered on YouTube on April 6, 2022.

Track listings
Digital download - single
 "Whiskey Does" – 3:36

Digital download - single
 "Whiskey Does" – 3:44(Reimagined) (featuring Roz)

Charts

References

2022 songs
2022 singles
Tim Hicks songs
Open Road Recordings singles
Songs about alcohol
Songs written by Tim Hicks
Songs written by Deric Ruttan
Songs written by Monty Criswell